Anna-Maria "Sandra" Cecchini (born 27 February 1965) is a retired professional tennis player from Italy.

Career
Cecchini turned professional in 1984. She won 12 singles and 11 doubles titles on the WTA Tour. She had career wins over Chris Evert, Arantxa Sánchez Vicario, Gabriela Sabatini, Nathalie Tauziat, Natasha Zvereva, and Anke Huber. Her most notable Grand Slam performance came at the French Open in 1985, when she reached the quarterfinals. In March 1988, she achieved her highest singles ranking of world No. 15.

WTA career finals

Singles: 18 (12–6)

Doubles: 22 (11–11)

ITF Circuit finals

Singles (2–0)

Grand Slam singles performance timeline

References

External links
 
 
 

1965 births
Living people
Italian female tennis players
People from Monte Carlo
Sportspeople from Bologna
Italian expatriates in Monaco